The 2004 NCAA Rifle Championships were contested at the 25th annual NCAA-sanctioned competition to determine the team and individual national champions of co-ed collegiate rifle shooting in the United States. 

The championships were held at the Pat Spurgin Rifle Range at Murray State University in Murray, Kentucky.

Five-time defending champions Alaska won the team championship, the Nanooks' sixth consecutive and seventh overall NCAA national title.

Qualification
With only one national collegiate championship for rifle shooting, all NCAA rifle programs (whether from Division I, Division II, or Division III) were eligible. A total of nine teams contested this championship.

Results
Scoring:  The championship consisted of 120 shots by each competitor in smallbore and 40 shots per competitor in air rifle.

Team title
(DC) = Defending champions
Italics = Inaugural championship

Individual events

References

NCAA Rifle Championship
NCAA Rifle Championships
2004 in shooting sports
NCAA Rifle Championships